Austin Cooper (1890–1964) was a Canadian–British illustrator and commercial artist. His work included cover illustrations for the Radio Times (including the 1935 Christmas edition) and posters for the London and North Eastern Railway, the Empire Marketing Board, London Transport, and the General Post Office. Examples of the latter are now in the collections of London Transport Museum and the British Postal Museum.

Career 

Cooper was born in Souris, Manitoba, Canada, on 5 March 1890, the son of an Irish farmer. Cooper studied at the Cardiff School of Art, and then the Allan-Frazer College of Art in Arbroath.

He began his career as a commercial artist after returning to Calgary, at a commercial art studio alongside fellow Arbroath student Adam Sherriff Scott. The two produced a  painting "Christ in Calgary" (1913; thought lost), which was exhibited unsigned at the Royal Picture Gallery there for six months, described by the Calgary News-Telegram (one of whose street-vendors was depicted in the painting) as showing:

On being identified as one of the artists Cooper's only comment, to a newspaper, was "We have nothing to say about it except what appears on the canvass". Subsequently, he and Sherriff-Scott set up their own company, Shagpat Studios, in Montreal.

During World War I he was in Flanders with the Canadian Black Watch, rising to Regimental Sergeant Major, before being discharged in 1919. He moved to London in 1922, having met his wife-to-be there.

From 1936 to 1940, he was principal of the London branch of the Reimann School of Commercial and Industrial Art.

Later in his career, in 1943, he gave up commercial art for abstract painting. His first solo exhibition was held in 1948, at the London Gallery. Several of his abstract works are in the collection of the Tate Gallery.

He died in 1964.

Bibliography

References

Further reading

External links 

 Austin Cooper (1890–1964) and the Art Of The Poster – 2010 blog post with photograph of Cooper

1890 births
1964 deaths
20th-century British painters
British illustrators
People from Souris, Manitoba
Canadian art educators
Artists from London
Artists from Manitoba
Artists from Montreal
Canadian military personnel of World War I
Black Watch soldiers
Writers from London
Writers from Manitoba
Writers from Montreal
20th-century Canadian non-fiction writers
British art teachers